The New York City Fire Department Bureau of Emergency Medical Services (FDNY EMS) is a division of the New York City Fire Department (FDNY) in charge of emergency medical services for New York City. It was established on March 17, 1996, following the merger of the FDNY and New York City Health and Hospitals Corporation's emergency medical services division. FDNY EMS provides coverage of all five boroughs of New York City with ambulances and a variety of specialized response vehicles.

History 
Prior to March 17, 1996, municipal ambulances were operated by NYC EMS under the New York City Health and Hospitals Corporation, a public benefit corporation, which dispatched both its own ambulances and hospital ambulances. On March 17, 1996, NYC EMS merged with the FDNY, forming the Bureau of EMS. Employees of the newly formed bureau were considered FDNY employees and became eligible for transfer to firefighter within the department. As a result of the merger, the FDNY Bureau of EMS became the largest fire department-based EMS system in the United States.

Operations 
FDNY EMS is led by the Chief of the Bureau of EMS Michael Fields. It is broken down into nine divisions. Each division is led by a division chief, up to 5 deputy chiefs, and a division captain. Each division is then broken down further into stations which are led by captains and lieutenants.

FDNY EMS controls the operation of all ambulances in the New York City 911 System. 65% of the ambulances in the 911 system are FDNY EMS municipal units while the remaining 35% of 911 system coverage is provided by hospital-based units known as Voluntary Hospital Ambulances, which are staffed by paid hospital personnel who work in partnership with FDNY EMS. Private ambulance services and Volunteer Ambulance Corps also make their resources available to supplement the 911 system in times of high call volume or severe weather. FDNY EMS maintains and controls Emergency Medical Dispatch (EMD), and telemetry (online medical control). FDNY EMS is also responsible for managing emergency medical care for all mass casualty incidents (MCI's) in New York City.

Training 
Prospective FDNY EMTs and Paramedics are trained at the FDNY EMS Academy at the historic Fort Totten (Queens). EMT training is between 13 and 16 weeks with the class length dependent on if the candidate holds a current New York state EMT certification. Paramedic training is a minimum 9 months for FDNY EMTs and 10 weeks for FDNY EMTs that wish to promote and hold a current New York state paramedic certification. All probationary EMT and Paramedic training is full-time with schedules that are 8.5 hours a day, 5 days a week. The academy also hosts certified first responder training for FDNY firefighters as well as other education for EMS members such as continuing medical education; emergency vehicle operations; CFR, EMT and Paramedic recertification classes; and other training. Initial and refresher training for the Haz-Tac battalion is conducted on Randalls and Wards Islands on the FDNY Fire-Suppression Academy campus.

Field Units 
The FDNY EMS uses a variety of units:
 Regular ambulances may be staffed to Basic Life Support (BLS) or Advanced Life Support (ALS) levels.
 Haz-Tac ambulances, also known as Hazardous Material Tactical Units, are ambulances with EMTs or Paramedics trained to the hazardous materials technician level allowing them to provide emergency medical care and decontamination in a hazardous environment. There are 39 haz-tac ambulance units.
 Rescue ambulances staff Rescue Medics and are ALS providers who are also trained to the level of hazmat technician in addition to training in high angle rescue, confined space medicine, treatment in other austere environments and water rescue training. There are 11 of these units throughout the city. These paramedics also possess an expanded scope of practice, including rapid sequence intubation, surgical cricothyrotomy, ultrasound, and additional drugs in their formulary. They are also able to assist an EMS response physician with select procedures during prolonged rescue operations.
 The bariatric unit is a specially designed ambulance that has a winch, ramp and stretcher rated for patients that are over 850 lbs.

 EMS conditions cars are vehicles assigned to EMS lieutenants or captains, the supervisors overseeing the activities of the ambulance crews in their jurisdiction. They may also respond to certain call types that may require a supervisor on scene to coordinate resources (e.g. a Mass-casualty incident, structure fires, cardiac arrests, motor vehicle collisions, etc.) There is generally one assigned per station.

 EMS major emergency response vehicles (MERV) are modified school busses that are able to treat multiple casualties at the same time, with ALS and BLS functions. The unit seats 14 and has a stretcher, and is assigned to all major medical emergencies within its borough. There is one MERV assigned to Divisions 1, 2 and 5 each. Brooklyn no longer has a MERV, while Queens' MERV was lost to a vehicle fire.

 EMS medical evacuation transportation units (METU) are large medical transports able to transport 24 non-ambulatory patients, 32 seated patients, or 10 wheel chair bound patients in the walkway for transport to area hospitals. There is one METU assigned to Divisions 3, 4 and 5 each. All three were purchased with Department of Homeland Security funds.
 EMS mobile respiratory treatment units (MRTU) are similar to METUs, and are also able to treat patients for smoke inhalation and other respiratory issues with oxygen, albuterol, and ipratropium bromide. One MRTU is located in Divisions 1, 2, 3 each.  All three were purchased with Department of Homeland Security funds.
 EMS logistical support units (LSU) carry medical supplies for use in mass-casualty incidents, as well as two generators, lights, a command tent and an inflatable tent.
Haz-Tac officers are rescue paramedics that respond alongside Haz-Tac and rescue ambulances as the medical component of the FDNY Special Operations Command. There are two of these specially designed units that can also function as EMS condition officers when needed.
 EMS response physicians are emergency physicians with specialized training in hazardous materials, technical rescue, and other specialized prehospital skills such as on-scene limb amputations. The response physician may provide medical control on scene if they respond to day-to-day 911 calls at their discretion, high profile assignments, major mass-casualty incidents or as part of the Rescue Medical Task Force for patients requiring technical rescue or prolonged extrication. The vehicle is also known as the Five Mary Car due to the radio designation Car 5M.

Apparatus

Livery

Immediately after the takeover of NYC EMS from HHC the FDNY changed the livery of the existing ambulances by changing the color the vehicles from predominately white with orange and blue striping to predominately white with blue and red striping.  The initials NYC EMS were replaced with the initials FDNY which were placed on the patient compartment of the vehicle with two letters on both sides of an existing Star of Life, with the word ambulance underneath.  The driver's side and passenger side doors were also adorned with the new command patch. Subsequent vehicles were ordered in the traditional FDNY livery of white over red with a set of three reflective stripes (gold, white, gold) running down the side.  All other markings were kept in place. Later, to improve visibility at night, the rear of the ambulances were painted with reflective red and white chevrons.

Vehicles
The FDNY Bureau of EMS utilizes custom specification Type I Ambulances, which are based on the chassis-cabs of light and medium duty pickup-trucks. This type was chosen over the Type II ambulance that are based on a passenger/cargo van chassis and the Type III which are based on chassis-cabs of light duty vans due to the ability to fully customize the passenger compartment.  Type I ambulances also offer a higher load-capacity and additional compartment space when compared to the two other types.  These ambulances are also more resilient to the stresses placed on them in a high volume EMS system in an inner city environment.

In 2011, the FDNY began ordering ambulances from Wheeled Coach which are based on a Dodge Ram 4500 Crew Cab Chassis.  The shift to a four-door ambulance was due to the tremendous call volume and harsh 24/7 cycle that the FDNY operates in. Furthermore, the additional cab space provided for crew comfort, additional storage, and the opportunity to have more than two people riding in the forward-facing configuration thus increasing safety if a third crew member is assigned. The department discontinued orders due to issues with the Dodge chassis.

In 2013, the FDNY began ordering a custom Ford F-450 Super Cab/Wheeled Coach Type I ambulance.

In 2016, the FDNY began ordering a new version of the F-450/Wheeled Coach ambulances which are labeled "FDNY Green". These use a technology to reduce harmful emissions caused by the necessary idling of ambulances.

In 2016, FDNY EMS ordered and received new International Terra-Star/Wheeled Coach Medium Duty Ambulances for use as "Rescue Medic" vehicles.

In 2017, FDNY EMS began using Ford F-550 Super Duty/Wheeled Coach Type I ambulances.

In 2020, FDNY EMS began to lease ambulances to augment the fleet as call volume increased dramatically. These leased ambulances are identifiable by an all white livery with a set of three reflective stripes (gold, red, gold) in place of the traditional stripes.

See also 
 Organization of the New York City Fire Department
 Voluntary Hospital Ambulances
 9-1-1 Tapping Protocol

References 

New York City Fire Department
Emergency services in New York (state)